Riad Benayad (born November 2, 1996) is an Algerian footballer who plays for Espérance de Tunis in the Tunisian Ligue Professionnelle 1 and Algeria national football team.

Club career
On September 29, 2017, Benayad made his professional debut for Paradou AC, coming as a second-half substitute in a league match against JS Saoura.
In 2022, he joined ES Tunis.

International career
Benayed was called up to the Algeria national team in May 2022.
He marked his debut with Algeria national football team as substitute in 2023 Africa Cup of Nations qualification match against Tanzania that is ended for Algeria 2–0.

References

External links
 

1996 births
Algerian footballers
Algerian Ligue Professionnelle 1 players
Tunisian Ligue Professionnelle 1 players
Paradou AC players
Espérance Sportive de Tunis players
Living people
People from Relizane
Association football forwards
21st-century Algerian people